Jonas von Geijer (born Jonas Lindberg April 17, 1981) is a Swedish sailor. He competed in the 49er class in the 2008 Summer Olympics and in the 2012 Summer Olympics.

References

Swedish male sailors (sport)
Living people
Olympic sailors of Sweden
Sailors at the 2008 Summer Olympics – 49er
Sailors at the 2012 Summer Olympics – 49er
1981 births

Jonas